Denwood is a surname. Notable people with the surname include:

Philip Denwood (born 1941), British Tibetologist
Wilf Denwood (1900–1959), British footballer

See also
Deanwood
Denwood, Arkansas
Denwood, Alberta

English-language surnames